Osteobrama is a genus of cyprinid fish found in southern Asia consisting of eight species.  The name is derived from the Greek word osteon, meaning "bone", and the Old French word breme, a type of freshwater fish.

Species
Osteobrama alfredianus (Valenciennes, 1844)
Osteobrama bakeri (F. Day, 1873)
Osteobrama belangeri (Valenciennes, 1844)
Osteobrama cotio (F. Hamilton, 1822)
Osteobrama cunma (F. Day, 1888)
Osteobrama feae Vinciguerra, 1890
Osteobrama neilli (F. Day, 1873)
Osteobrama peninsularis Silas, 1952
Osteobrama vigorsii (Sykes, 1839)

Osteobrama bhimensis is a synonym of Osteobrama vigorsii according to Fishbase, and Fishbase also treats the former subspecies of O. cotio as distinct species: O. cotio, O. cunma and O. peninsularis.

References
Notes

Bibliography

 
Cyprinid fish of Asia
Cyprinidae genera